Angelo Ylagan Castro Jr. (6 March 1945 – 5 April 2012) was a Filipino broadcast journalist and actor. He was a news anchor for The World Tonight, the flagship news program of ABS-CBN and ANC. He anchored several ABS-CBN and ANC news and current events programs for the past 25 years. Castro is a recipient of the Ka Doroy Broadcaster of the Year award from the Kapisanan ng mga Brodkaster ng Pilipinas.

Castro died at age 67 after succumbing to lung cancer.

Early life and career
Castro studied at the University of the Philippines, where he joined the Upsilon Sigma Phi.

Acting career
Before becoming a journalist, Castro had a flourishing television and film career. He was cast as Bong in Baltic and Co., broadcast over the GMA-7 network during the mid-1970s.

Castro was nominated in the 1982 FAMAS Awards as Best Supporting Actor for Kumander Alibasbas.

Broadcasting
Castro joined ABS-CBN when it reopened in 1986 after the EDSA Revolution and became its news manager. He created TV Patrol, the longest-running Filipino newscast. Castro anchored The World Tonight in 1986 with Loren Legarda.

In 2000, Castro became ABS-CBN's senior vice-president for news and current affairs. He left that post a year later but continued to anchor The World Tonight. He also hosted the travel show Las Islas Filipinas on ANC.

Castro retired in September 2009, but returned as news anchor on The World Tonight in November 2011. He was joined by Tina Monzon-Palma and Teddyboy Locsin. He finally left the show for the last time when his health continued to deteriorate.

Personal life
He was the son of Angelo Castro Sr, a broadcaster, former Philippine Information attaché to San Francisco, and former Press Undersecretary. He was married to fellow actress-broadcaster June Keithley (1947–2013), and is the father of actor-broadcaster Diego Castro III, Gabriella, and Angelica. Castro is also the uncle of musicians Kenneth Ilagan and Mondo Castro.

Health and death
In 2008, he was diagnosed with lung cancer and given three months to live. Castro outlived this prognosis by three years, dying on 5 April 2012, a month after his 67th birthday, at St. Luke's Medical Center, Quezon City.

Aftermath
Presidential spokesperson Edwin Lacierda said after it was announced that Castro had died:

Awards and nominations
1982 Nominee, FAMAS Award for Best Supporting Actor for Kumander Alibasbas (1981)

References

External links
 

1945 births
2012 deaths
People from Manila
Filipino male film actors
Deaths from lung cancer in the Philippines
ABS-CBN News and Current Affairs people
Filipino television news anchors
Filipino male television actors